Kappa Alpha Psi Fraternity, Inc. is a historically African American fraternity. Since the fraternity's founding on January 5, 1911 at Indiana University Bloomington, the fraternity has never restricted membership on the basis of color, creed or national origin though membership traditionally is dominated by those of African heritage. The fraternity has over 160,000 members with 721 undergraduate and alumni chapters in every state of the United States, and international chapters in the United Kingdom, Germany, South Korea, Japan, United States Virgin Islands, Nigeria, South Africa, and The Bahamas.

The president of the national fraternity is known as the Grand Polemarch, who assigns a Province Polemarch for each of the twelve provinces (regions) of the nation. The fraternity has many notable members recognized as leaders in the arts, athletics, business, Civil Rights, education, government, and science sectors at the local, national and international level. The Kappa Alpha Psi Journal has been the official magazine of the fraternity since 1914. The Journal is published four times a year in February, April, October and December. Frank M. Summers was the magazine's first editor and later became the Fourteenth Grand Polemarch.  The former editor of the magazine was Jonathan Hicks. The current editor of the magazine is Earl T. Tildon.

Kappa Alpha Psi sponsors programs providing community service, social welfare and academic scholarship through the Kappa Alpha Psi Foundation and is a supporter of the United Negro College Fund and Habitat for Humanity. Kappa Alpha Psi is a member of the National Pan-Hellenic Council (NPHC) and the North American Interfraternity Conference (NIC). The fraternity is the oldest predominantly African American Greek-letter society founded west of the Appalachian Mountains still in existence, and is known for its "cane stepping" in NPHC organized step shows. Kappa Alpha Psi celebrated its 100th anniversary on January 5, 2011; one of four African American intercollegiate fraternities to do so.

History

Founders
The founders of Kappa Alpha Psi Fraternity, Inc. are: Elder Watson Diggs, more affectionately known as 'The Dreamer', Dr. Ezra D. Alexander, Dr. Byron Kenneth Armstrong, Atty. Henry Tourner Asher, Dr. Marcus Peter Blakemore, Paul Waymond Caine, George Wesley Edmonds, Dr. Guy Levis Grant, Edward Giles Irvin, and Sgt. John Milton Lee.

The founders endeavored to establish the fraternity with a strong foundation before embarking on plans of expansion. By the end of the first year, the ritual was completed, and a design for the coat of arms and motto had begun. Frederick Mitchell's name is on the application for the incorporation of the fraternity but  withdrew from school and thus never became a member of the fraternity.

Founding
The fraternity was founded as Kappa Alpha Nu on the night of January 5, 1911, by ten African-American college students. The decision upon the name Kappa Alpha Nu may have been to honor the Alpha Kappa Nu club which began in 1903 on the Indiana University campus but had too few registrants to effect continued operation. The organization known today as Kappa Alpha Psi was nationally incorporated under the name of Kappa Alpha Nu on May 15, 1911. The name of the organization was changed to its current name in 1915, shortly after its creation. The fraternity is unique among NPHC affiliated organizations  in that it has two names: Kappa Alpha Psi (ΚΑΨ) and Phi Nu Pi (ΦΝΠ). This second name is the source of the nickname for members, "Nupes".

During this time there were very few African-American students at the majority white campus at Bloomington, Indiana and they were a small minority due to the era of the Jim Crow laws. Many African-American students rarely saw each other on campus and were discouraged or prohibited from attending student functions and extracurricular activities by white college administrators and fellow students. African-American students were denied membership on athletic teams with the exception of track and field. The racial prejudice and discrimination encountered by the founders strengthened their bond of friendship and growing interest in starting a social group.

By 1913, the fraternity expanded with the second undergraduate chapter opened at the University of Illinois—Beta chapter; then the University of Iowa—Gamma chapter. After this, Kappa Alpha Psi chartered undergraduate chapters on Black college campuses at Wilberforce University—Delta chapter, and Lincoln University (Pennsylvania)—Epsilon chapter. In 1920, Xi chapter was chartered at Howard University. In 1921, the fraternity installed the Omicron chapter at Columbia University, its first at an Ivy League university. The fraternity's first chapter in the South was established in 1921 at Morehouse CollegePi chapter. The first chapter in the West was established in 1923 at University of California, Los AngelesUpsilon chapter. Kappa Alpha Psi expanded through the Midwest, South, and West at both white and black colleges.

Some believe the Greek letters Kappa Alpha Nu were chosen as a tribute to Alpha Kappa Nu, but the name became an ethnic slur among racist factions. Founder Elder Watson Diggs, while observing a young initiate compete in a track meet, overheard fans referring to the member as a "kappa alpha nig", and a campaign to rename the fraternity ensued. The resolution to rename the group was adopted in December 1914, and the fraternity states, "the name acquired a distinctive Greek letter symbol and KAPPA ALPHA PSI thereby became a Greek letter Fraternity in every sense of the designation." Kappa Alpha Psi has been the official name since April 15, 1915.

In 1947, at the Los Angeles Conclave, the National Silhouettes of Kappa Alpha Psi were established as an auxiliary group, which membership comprises wives or widows of fraternity members. In 1980, the Silhouettes were officially recognized and granted a seat on the board of directors of the Kappa Alpha Psi Foundation. Silhouettes provide support and assistance for the activities of Kappa Alpha Psi at the Grand chapter, province and local levels.

The Kappa "Kane"
In the 1950s, as black Greek-letter organizations began the tradition of step shows, the fraternity began using the "Kappa Kane" in what it termed "cane stepping". The kappa canes were longer in the 1950s than in later decades. In the early 1960s, the cane was decorated with the fraternity colors. In the 1970s the cane was shortened so brothers could "twirl" and tap the cane in the choreography with high dexterity. The process of covering the cane in the fraternal colors is considered as 'wrapping' and is done very specifically.

In the 1960s the national organization did not condone the use of canes or Kappa Alpha Psi's participation in step shows contending that "the hours spent in step practices by chapters each week would be better devoted to academic or civic achievement."  Senior Grand Vice Polemarch Ullysses McBride complained about the vulgar language and obscene gestures sometimes engaged in by cane-stepping participants during these stepshows. In 1986, during the fraternity's 66th national meeting, cane stepping was finally recognized as an important staple of Kappa Alpha Psi.

National programs

Guide Right
Guide Right is a program for the educational and occupational guidance of youth, primarily inspirational and informational in character. Its reach extends to high schools and colleges alike. In the latter, giving due attention to the needs of undergraduate Brothers.

Conceived in 1922 by Leon Wop Stewart, and suggested at the twelfth Grand chapter of Kappa Alpha Psi, Guide Right became the Fraternity's National Service Program. Jesse Jerome Peters, later to become the eighth Grand Polemarch, was chairman of the committee, during the administration of W. Ellis Stewart as Grand Polemarch.

Guide Right is administrated by a National Director and a Guide Right Commission. The Guide Right Commission consists of the Director and twelve Province Guide Right Coordinators, one from each Province, appointed by their respective Province Polemarchs. The Director is uniquely qualified to perform the duties of this office and is appointed by the Grand Polemarch. He prepares such directives as are necessary for the successful and efficient observance of this National movement. He also edits and prepares the Manual for the universal use of Undergraduate and Alumni.

The five national Guide Right initiatives  are Kappa League, Jr. Kappa League, A-MAN Program, St. Jude Research Hospital, and the premier program, "Kappa Kamp," which enables inner city boys to attend camps across the county. In addition to the above-mentioned national initiatives, chapters within the Fraternity sponsor a wide variety of Guide Right programs in their communities that support their local youth.

Kappa League
The Kappa League was founded Thursday, February 12, 1970 by the Los Angeles (CA) Alumni chapter of Kappa Alpha Psi; under the direction of Leon W Steward. Steward brought the idea to Los Angeles from Dayton, Ohio, where he had worked closely with Jay Crosby to expand the guide right activities of Dayton (OH) Alumni chapter. The Kappa League is a series of activities designed to help young high school male students develop their leadership talents. The activities provide both challenging and rewarding experiences to enhance their lives. The goal of the League is to help the students achieve worthy goals for themselves and to make meaningful contributions to their communities. The League includes a series of workshops to achieve its goals. Students from grades of 6 to 12th can join .

Student of the Year Competition
The Student of the Year Competition is a contest that encompasses six areas deemed critical to a successful life - scholarship, talent, community involvement, poise and appearance, career preparation, and model chapter operation. Each Province sponsors a pageant during its council. In the year of a Grand Chapter Meeting, the Province winners compete at the Grand Chapter Meeting. The first Student of the Year Pageant was held on May 20, 1972 at Drexel University, under the direction of Mel Davis. The first Pageant at the Grand Chapter Meeting occurred at the 58th Grand Chapter Meeting.

Kappa Alpha Psi Foundation
The "Kappa Alpha Psi Foundation," established in 1981, is the philanthropic arm of the fraternity and assists both alumni and undergraduate chapters in support of scholarships, after-school programs, and national projects such as Habitat for Humanity.

The Kappa Alpha Psi Foundation was conceived by Dr. Oliver S. Gumbs, the 23rd Grand Polemarch. His dream began to take shape at a May 1982 with the past Grand Polemarchs and the national officers in Washington, D.C. He proposed forming a separate 501(c)(3) charitable foundation to accept contributions to finance the headquarter's renovation project. Fraternity members contributing to the new foundation could deduct their donations as charitable contributions for income tax purposes. The foundation would also accept contributions from individuals, organizations and businesses.

Pan-Hellenic membership

The fraternity maintains dual membership in the National Pan-Hellenic Council (NPHC) and the North American Interfraternity Conference (NIC).

The NPHC is composed of nine international black Greek-letter sororities and fraternities and promotes interaction through forums, meetings, and other mediums for the exchange of information, and engages in cooperative programming and initiatives through various activities and functions.

The NIC serves to advocate the needs of its member fraternities through enrichment of the fraternity experience, advancement and growth of the fraternity community, and enhancement of the educational mission of the host institutions.

Membership

Kappa Alpha Psi offers undergraduate and graduate membership to potential aspirants, and its constitution has never contained any clause which either excluded or suggested the exclusion of a man from membership because of color, creed, or national origin.  Undergraduate chapters are located on more than 406 College and University campuses and Alumni chapters are arrayed in some 367 cities in the United States and 9 foreign countries.

To be considered for membership, a candidate must have at least a 2.5 gpa on a 4.0 scale. For consideration into Kappa Alpha Psi on the alumni level, one must possess at least a bachelor's degree or the equivalent of such a degree from an accredited college or university. Kappa Alpha Psi also prides itself in that it no longer bestows honorary membership.

Controversies

Embezzlement
In February 2022, fraternity member and head financial director of the fraternity, Curtis Anderson, was sentenced to 2.5 years in prison for embezzling $3 million from the fraternity over six years.  Other fraternity leaders were alerted by Santander Bank of many suspicious transactions which lead to his firing and arrest.  Anderson admitted to dealing with gambling and alcohol addictions.  Prosecutors confirmed he blew most of the money at Harrah's Philadelphia Casino & Racetrack.

Hazing controversies

Kappa Alpha Psi was founded January 5, 1911, at Indiana University, Bloomington, Indiana and its opposition to hazing or unlawful or anti-social conduct of any kind has been continuous since its founding, implicit in its founding precepts and explicit in its declaration first published in the year 1949 stating that hazing in any form is illegal.

It is the goal of the fraternity to see that all individuals committing acts of hazing and other unlawful and prohibited acts are punished consistent with due process and the concept of proportionality to the full extent of the rules of the fraternity, college and the criminal law.

Kappa Alpha Psi does not condone hazing and has outlawed pledging. In 1990, Kappa Alpha Psi along with fellow NPHC organizations issued a joint statement announcing the elimination of pledging. The fraternity revised its membership development and intake process, instituted policies against hazing and has taken steps to reinforce and strengthen its stance against prohibited conduct. The fraternity backed its stance by releasing Executive Order One in 1988, Executive Order Two in 1993, and Executive Order Three in 1994.  However, the culture of underground pledging is deeply embedded in fraternities and sororities as a whole and extreme hazing continues to be widespread across the organization.

Kappa Alpha Psi seeks to remove any and all opportunities for pledging, hazing, antisocial and unlawful activity and seeks to promote in every phase of fraternity life only safe and wholesome activities which are consistent with the Code of Conduct of the colleges, universities and jurisdictions where chapters are chartered.  Any member, who participates in underground pledge activities, or hazing of any kind, shall be expelled from the fraternity.

Some members of Kappa Alpha Psi, who do not subscribe to the organization's motto of achievement, have elected, in defiance of the rules and regulations of the Fraternity, to conduct underground pledging and engage in acts of hazing in clear violation of fraternity rules and criminal statutes of the various states.  As a result, the fraternity has had many complaints of hazing lodged against it, most related to the pledging process.

In 1994, Michael Davis, a Southeast Missouri State University student, was beaten to death participating in a pledging ritual by members of Kappa Alpha Psi.  After a pledging ritual, fraternity members placed his lifeless body in his bed where he was officially pronounced dead. His family won a $1.4 million wrongful death lawsuit against the fraternity and several Kappas served time in prison. 

In 1998, 11 Kappas affiliated with the University of Maryland Eastern Shore were charged with first-degree assault and reckless endangerment for hospitalizing several pledges. One pledge was beaten so badly that many of the veins in his backside were broken and he developed a life-threatening gangrene infection.

In 2006, the chapter at Florida A&M University was suspended after two members were sentenced to serve two years in prison and three others given three years of probation due to an anti-hazing law established in Florida following a hazing death involving the Kappa Sigma fraternity at the University of Miami in 2001.  According to sworn complaints made by pledges at FAMU, they were punched, hit with canes, hit with two-by-fours, and suffered extreme exhaustion due to hazing.  One pledge was admitted to a hospital for two days after a brutal night of hazing left him with a ruptured ear drum and half a pint of lost blood.

In 2009, Louisiana State University (LSU) placed an eleven-year ban on the fraternity for repeated hazing violations and severe abuse of pledges. LSU will not consider reinstatement of the fraternity until at least 2020.

Also in 2009, two Kappas at the University of North Texas were arrested and charged with a Class B misdemeanor for brutally beating a pledge with a paddle.

And also in 2009, a former pledge at the University of Tennessee at Chattanooga sued the fraternity for $1 million to cover medical bills caused by an encounter with violent fraternity members.

In 2010, a pre-med student at Wayne State University suffered kidney failure and was hospitalized for twelve days after weeks of physical abuse by men of the fraternity.

Also in 2010, the fraternity chapter was permanently banned from the campus of Georgia State University for being a repeat offender and beating a student pledging so badly that he coughed up blood.

In 2011, the fraternity registration was cancelled at the University of Texas at San Antonio for striking pledges and providing misleading information to university officials during the hazing investigation.

In March 2012, the University of Florida chapter of Kappa Alpha Psi was suspended because of thirteen misdemeanor-level sworn complaints involving striking and harassing pledges.

In April 2012, the fraternity at Arkansas Tech University was permanently banned from campus for beating a pledge into a coma.

In 2013, a former pledge at California State University-Bakersfield sued the fraternity after being shot with a BB gun and hit with canes and horse whips that left him paralyzed.

Also in 2013, nine Kappas were charged with felony assault for severely beating pledges from Youngstown State University.

In 2014, 11 Kappas from the University of Georgia were arrested and charged with hazing for severely beating and humiliating pledges.

In March 2014, several Kappas from the University of Memphis were arrested and charged for hazing and beating pledges.

In March 2014, five Kappas from the University of Central Arkansas were arrested for beating pledges.

In 2015, a D.C. man sued the fraternity for hazing and humiliation. The 45-year-old filed a $2 million lawsuit because he stated after paying his non-refundable $3,000 graduate intake membership fee, he was coerced to allow himself to be beaten with a cane, rub lotion on a Kappa, and clean a Kappa's house in only his underwear and bare feet to become a welcomed member of the fraternity.

Also in 2015, a former pledge at Coppin State University sued the fraternity for $4 million due to injuries he sustained while pledging.  In his lawsuit, he stated he was even beaten and terrorized by CSU Kappa alumni members in their 30s and 40s.

In 2016, three unidentified men affiliated with the fraternity at the University of Central Florida (UCF) were brutally beaten by Kappas after dropping their twirling canes while dancing according to witnesses.  The UCF chapter was placed on suspension and  under investigation.

Also in 2016, the chapter at Florida State University (FSU) was suspended by the university after a concerned mother of a pledge shared with a Tallahassee news station a disturbing video showing pledges being brutally beaten with canes by Kappas. FSU also placed the chapter under investigation to identify and prosecute all members involved in the beatings.

In 2018, it was reported that the chapter at Edward Waters College was beating and paddling pledges as well as forcing them to take a designer drug called "jig," a mixture of synthetic heroin, cocaine and LSD.

In 2018, the Pi chapter at Morehouse College was given a 30-year suspension from the college after pledges were beaten, hit with canes, and punched multiple times. It was also reported from one of the pledges that their Dean made them commit an activity called "Eat the Pi" a traditional chapter ritual where the pledges are ordered to perform cunnilingus on paid sex workers. 

In March 2019, Delaware State University student Marlon W. Jackson died and three other students were hospitalized after a car crash due to sleep deprivation caused by pledging the fraternity. As a result, the Delaware State University chapter was suspended for 10 years.

In April 2019, three Virginia State University members were arrested and charged with 10 counts of hazing. Eight other fraternity members received University discipline but no criminal charges related to a hazing incident.

Provinces

In 1921, the Fraternity was divided into districts as a result of proposed legislation by George F. David II, the third Grand Polemarch. David was first Grand Polemarch who had not been nurtured by the Alpha chapter under the influence of the Founders, proposed dividing the Fraternity into supervisory districts. The idea originated with his father who was a Presiding Elder of the A.M.E. Church. Grand Polemarch David II, implemented the division of the Fraternity into three districts. Past Grand Polemarch Irven Armstrong was assigned the first; Harrison R. Duke, the second; and Harold M. Tyler, the third district. The three districts grew into four "regions". Fifth Grand Polemarch Earl B. Dickerson changed the designation of "Region" to "Province" and "Regional Director" to "Province Polemarch" at the 15th Grand Chapter Meeting in 1925. And during the original establishment of provinces, the following provinces were established: Eastern, Middle Eastern, Central, Great Lakes, Northwestern, Western, Southern, and Southeastern Provinces. Currently there are 12 provinces with the following names:

Chapters

Kappa Alpha Psi has chartered over 721 undergraduate, alumni, and international chapters. The fraternity has over 150,000 members and is divided into twelve provinces (districts/regions), with each chapter under the aegis of a province.

Notable members

See also
List of social fraternities and sororities

References

Further reading

External links

 

 
Student organizations established in 1911
International student societies
National Pan-Hellenic Council
North American Interfraternity Conference
Student societies in the United States
1911 establishments in Indiana